Taslima Abed was a Bangladeshi women's right activist and Bangladesh Awami League politician. She served as a Member of Parliament and the State Minister of Women and Children Affairs.

Career
Abed was a Member of Parliament in 1972. She was the founding treasurer of the Kendrio Mohila Punorbashon Songstha, a foundation dedicated to aid the women raped by members of Pakistan military forces during the Bangladesh Liberation war and founded by Sufia Kamal. The foundation had rehabilitation programs for rape victims in Eskaton, Dhaka. In 1974, the Government of Bangladesh renamed the foundation Bangladesh Women's Rehabilitation and Welfare Foundation and it was attached to the Ministry of Women and Children Affairs.

In 1980, Abed served as the State Minister of Women and Children Affairs. She led the Bangladesh delegation to the Convention on the Elimination of All forms of Discrimination Against Women in July 1980 in Copenhagen. She said that economic independence for women is necessary for the development of the nation. She said "In economic independence you get honor".

References

Awami League politicians
Living people
State Ministers of Women and Children Affairs (Bangladesh)
Year of birth missing (living people)
20th-century Bangladeshi women politicians
Women members of the Jatiya Sangsad
1st Jatiya Sangsad members
Bangladesh Krishak Sramik Awami League central committee members